Xenodon pulcher (common names: tricolor hognose snake or banded hognose snake) is a species of fossorial snake in the family Colubridae. It is found in southern South America.

Taxonomy 
Xenodon pulcher was sometimes previously described as Lystrophis pulcher. This genus describes the South American hognose snakes, which while similar in appearance to North American (Heterodon) and Madagascan (Leioheterodon) hognoses, are not closely related.

This snake's common names include tricolor hognose snake, banded hognose snake, culebra falsa, and false coral snake. It is sometimes incorrectly called ringed hognose snake, the common name for Xenodon semicinctus. Both X. pulcher and X. semicinctus are similar in appearance, which may be the cause of naming confusion.

Description 
This snake is distinguishable by its namesake upturned rostral scale and striking banded pattern of white stripes bordered with black on a red base. They use mimicry for defense, as they display the same colors and patterns as some venomous coral snakes. When threatened, it may use a defensive display involving bluff strikes, neck flattening, and spastic movements similar to coral snakes. While these snakes possess a relatively stocky body shape similar to Heterodon, they are usually somewhat smaller and slimmer. Female snakes grow up to 24 inches, while males stay smaller at 18-20 inches. Both have a lifespan of 7-8 years, considerably shorter than most hognose snakes.

Xenodon pulcher are rear-fanged venomous like members of Heterodon. While the latter have extremely mild venom that only causes minor pain and swelling in humans, some anecdotal evidence shows X. pulcher venom may be slightly more toxic.

Range 
X. pulcher is primarily found in the Chaco bioregion, extending through Bolivia, Paraguay, and northern Argentina. Their range may extend into Chile and parts of southwestern Brazil. This region is a dry, sandy environment on the eastern foothills of the Andes, characterized by dry scrubland, grasslands, and savannahs. They are typically found near streams, as their diet consists mainly of amphibians (similar to other hognose snakes).

References 

Reptiles described in 1863
Colubrids
Reptiles of South America